Parkdale Avenue may refer to:

 Parkdale Avenue (Hamilton, Ontario), Canada, a road in Hamilton, Ontario
 Parkdale Avenue (Ottawa), Ontario, Canada

See also
 Parkdale (disambiguation)